Jay Nieuwland (born 1990) is a New Zealand poet, editor and co-founder of the publishing house We Are Babies. Her 2021 publication I Am a Human Being won the best first book award (poetry) at the Ockham New Zealand Book Awards.

Biography 

Nieuwland was born and raised in Wellington. She first seriously began writing poetry in high school, after developing a passion for New Zealand hip hop artists such as Frontline and the Breakin Wreckwordz hip-hop collective, eventually realising that she was drawn to the process of writing, instead of hip-hop performance. Nieuwland studied creative writing at Whitireia New Zealand.

Together with American poet Carolyn DeCarlo, Nieuwland co-founded the independent publishing house We Are Babies. Nieuwland and DeCarlo worked on a number of projects, including the eBook Twilight Zone (2013) and Bound: an Ode to Falling in Love (2014), a fictionalised chapbook telling the story of Kim Kardashian and Kanye West's relationship. In 2015, We Are Babies released the poetry anthology Left: a Book of Words and Pictures, which featured Nieuwland as the work's editor. Nieuwland and DeCarlo also founded the zine/poetry reading collective Food Court, which eventually expanded to become a physical store in Newtown, Wellington. The store shut down in 2022.

In the early 2010s, Nieuwland began writing the poetry collection I Am a Human Being. Half way through the writing process, Nieuwland realised that she was genderqueer. I Am a Human Being was eventually published by Compound Press in 2020, winning the MitoQ Best First Book Award for Poetry at the 2021 Ockham New Zealand Book Awards, and was longlisted for the Mary and Peter Biggs Award for Poetry.

As of 2022, Nieuwland is completing a PhD in poetics.

Personal life 

Nieuwland previously identified as genderqueer. In 2021, Nieuwland came out as a trans woman, and started using she/her pronouns.

Nieuwland met Carolyn DeCarlo online in 2011, on the literary website HTMLGIANT. After the pair developed a long-distance relationship, DeCarlo moved to New Zealand from Maryland. Nieuwland and DeCarlo separated in 2022.

Bibliography

References

1990 births
New Zealand LGBT poets
Living people
People from the Wellington Region
Transgender women
Transgender poets
21st-century New Zealand poets
21st-century New Zealand women writers
New Zealand women poets